Caroline Garcia and Katarina Srebotnik were the defending champions, but Garcia chose not to participate this year. Srebotnik played alongside Andreja Klepač, but lost in the first round to Anna-Lena Grönefeld and Květa Peschke.

Darija Jurak and Anastasia Rodionova won the title, defeating Chan Hao-ching and Chan Yung-jan in the final, 5–7, 7–6(7–4), [10–6].

Seeds

Draw

External links
 Main draw

Aegon Internationalandnbsp;- Doubles
2016 Doubles